

This is a list of the National Register of Historic Places listings in Shelby County, Indiana.

This is intended to be a complete list of the properties and districts on the National Register of Historic Places in Shelby County, Indiana, United States. Latitude and longitude coordinates are provided for many National Register properties and districts; these locations may be seen together in a map.

There are 13 properties and districts listed on the National Register in the county.

Properties and districts located in incorporated areas display the name of the municipality, while properties and districts in unincorporated areas display the name of their civil township.  Properties and districts split between multiple jurisdictions display the names of all jurisdictions.

Current listings

|}

See also
 
 List of National Historic Landmarks in Indiana
 National Register of Historic Places listings in Indiana
 Listings in neighboring counties: Bartholomew, Decatur, Hancock, Johnson, Marion, Rush
 List of Indiana state historical markers in Shelby County

References

 
Shelby County